Sir Henry Josiah Lightfoot Boston, GCMG (19 August 1898 – 14 December 1969) was a Sierra Leonean diplomat and politician. He was the first Sierra Leonean Governor-General of Sierra Leone. He was a member of the Creole ethnic group (descendant of freed slaves from Nova Scotia, United States and Great Britain landed in Freetown between 1792 and 1855).

Career 
Lightfoot Boston served as Speaker of the Parliament of Sierra Leone from 1957 to 1962 and as Governor-General of Sierra Leone from 7 July 1962 to 26 March 1967. He was preceded by British diplomat Sir Maurice Henry Dorman and succeeded after a coup d'état by Brigadier Andrew Juxon-Smith.

Legacy 
Lightfoot Boston Street in Freetown is named in his honor.

Lightfoot Boston's image is featured on a 50 Leone coin issued by the Bank of Sierra Leone.

References

External links 
 List of Sierra Leonean heads of state

1898 births
1969 deaths
Fourah Bay College alumni
Alumni of the University of London
Governors-General of Sierra Leone
Speakers of the Parliament of Sierra Leone
People from Freetown
Sierra Leonean politicians
Sierra Leone Creole people
People of Sierra Leone Creole descent
Knights Grand Cross of the Order of St Michael and St George
Sierra Leonean knights